Chi Alpha |  (sometimes XA, χα, xa, or SfC - Students for Christ, officially known as Chi Alpha Christian Fellowship), is an international and interdenominational, coeducational Christian fellowship, social club, student society, and service organization founded in 1953 on the campus of Missouri State University (then known as Southwest Missouri State College) in Springfield, Missouri. Chi Alpha is sponsored by the Assemblies of God USA, a Pentecostal denomination established after separating from the historically African American Church of God in Christ in 1914 over race and administration.

Chi Alpha defines as mission as "to reconcile students to Jesus Christ, thereby transforming the university, the marketplace, and the world..." It describes its core values or pillars as community, creativity, diversity, excellence, integrity, servant-leadership, and evangelism. Its self-described five-fold approach is prayer, worship, fellowship, discipleship, and mission. It's philanthropic and service organization affiliation is the Convoy of Hope. Through its campus ministries and fellowships, Chi Alpha operates a missionary internship program through the World Assemblies of God Fellowship, requiring doctrinal assent.

Etymology 
The name Chi Alpha was inspired by the contemporary Assemblies of God youth movement, Christ's Ambassadors (a phrase in 2 Corinthians 5:20). The initials "CA" were changed to the Greek alphabet initials "ΧΑ" (and its Latin Script's stylized equivalent of "XA") in order to resemble the names of other college organizations, in particular Greek-letter fraternities and sororities.

History
Chi Alpha Christian Fellowship originates from within Assemblies of God USA as a ministry to collegians in 1947 at the urging of J. Robert Ashcroft (father of John Ashcroft), consisting of a newsletter sent to college students to encourage them in their faith. 

After Ashcroft's newsletter publications, it soon became apparent that a newsletter by itself was inadequate, and so in 1953 Dr. J. Calvin Holsinger chartered the first Assemblies of God student group at Missouri State University (formerly Southwest Missouri State University) in Springfield, Missouri where the Assemblies of God headquarters is located; the Assemblies of God USA and its World Assemblies of God Fellowship were originally established in Arkansas upon separating from the historically African-American Church of God in Christ in 1914 in disagreement with episcopal governance and other controversies pertaining to race relations in the United States. The movement inspired and sponsored by Assemblies of God quickly spread to other campuses. For example, the first Chi Alpha to own property was the UC Berkeley chapter, which purchased a house next to campus in 1964. 

Chi Alpha began its development internationally in the 1970s, establishing chapters in Europe under the name Students for Christ, and also into Latin America under various names.

In 1977, the first ever Chi Alpha internship was launched at Western Washington University (WWU) in Bellingham, Washington by the WWU Chi Alpha campus director Brady Bobbink.

In 1978, Dennis Gaylor became national director of Chi Alpha, and served until April 2013. Chi Alpha is currently led by Scott Martin.

Annie Dillard wrote a widely reprinted essay—"Singing with the Fundamentalists"—about her experiences singing with a group of students from the Chi Alpha chapter at Western Washington University (a chapter which operated under the local name of Campus Christian Fellowship).

The Chi Alpha chapters at Georgetown University and the University of New Hampshire were highlighted in a 2003 article in The New York Times entitled "Of Bart and Homer, and the Many Ways of Faith" —an article about their use of The Simpsons as a Bible study tool, and in 1986 The New York Times mentioned the chapter at Columbia University as representative of a trend of growing Christian fellowships on campuses in the northeastern United States.

In the 2014-2015 school year, Chi Alpha at CSU Stanislaus was removed from campus because they required that their leaders be Christians. The case gained national attention through conservative news channel Fox News. The chapter was eventually reinstated.

In 2019, Chi Alpha's Winona State University fellowship was highlighted by former members for allegations of students following "cult-like" personalities; its campus leader was alleged of favoritism and shaming student party-goers and drinkers; additional allegations included mishandling sexual abuse and psychological abuse. From 2021-2022, the fellowship was highlighted for leadership's accusations of discrimination against the LGBT community, students having premarital sex, and students who consume alcohol. In July 2022, a pastor working for Chi Alpha was arrested for "continuous sexual abuse of a child," pleading innocence.

Chapters 
Chi Alpha within the United States has a large presence throughout the South and Midwest. Globally, its second-largest presence is in Europe, within some predominantly and historically Catholic and Eastern Orthodox countries of Western, Central, and Mediterranean Europe. At the beginning of the 21st century, there have been Chi Alpha ministries and fellowships on over 310 campuses throughout the United States as of 2010. As of 2022, Chi Alpha had a presence at 275 campuses throughout the United States.

Notable alumni 

 Kris Allen, the 2009 American Idol winner, was a member of Chi Alpha when he was a student at University of Central Arkansas in Conway, Arkansas.
 Carson Wentz, Quarterback for Washington Commanders

See also 

 Baptist Collegiate Network

References

External links 
 

Assemblies of God
Christian organizations established in 1953
Student religious organizations in the United States
Evangelical organizations
Fellowships
Student organizations in the United States
Student societies in the United States
Student religious organisations in Germany
Christian student societies in Germany
Student religious organisations in Belgium
International student religious organizations
Service organizations based in the United States
Christian fraternities and sororities in the United States
Missouri State University